Hart Rock is a rock,  high, lying  northwest of the Herdman Rocks and  north-northeast of the eastern extremity of Laurie Island, in the South Orkney Islands. It was first charted in 1838 by a French expedition under d'Urville. The rock was named in 1933 by Discovery Investigations personnel on the Discovery II, for T. John Hart, a member of the zoological staff of the Discovery Committee.

References

Rock formations of the South Orkney Islands